Yedigöl is a neighbourhood in the İspir District of Erzurum Province in Turkey.<

References

Villages in İspir District